Smogus is a nu metal band from the Netherlands. The band was founded in 1995 by four school friends. During the recording of their first album, Everybody's Fucked Up Twice,  they met Arno Dreef and Wiebe van den Ende who joined the band.  The band members are Jaap van Duijvenbode (Guitar), Ruben Bandstra (Drums), Daniel de Jongh (Vocals), Wiebe van den Ende (Raps/Vocals), Jeroen Bax (Bass), Arno Dreef (Guitar).  The band has won an Essent Award and played at festivals such as Ozzfest and Lowlands.

Smogus was founded in 1995 by Jaap, Ruben, Daniel and Jeroen. During the recording of their debut album Everybody's Fucked Up Twice the four school friends met with Arno and Wiebe.  The six of them hit it off immediately and very soon both Arno and Wiebe decided to complete the band's line-up.  They released two tracks on a split EP on vinyl on the WOTNXT label.  In 2002, the band signed a deal with BMG and released a 6-track EP.  They then released No Matter What The Outcome on The Electric Co., a Dutch label focused on Dutch talent and linked to Universal Music.

Discography 
 Everybody's Fucked Up Twice (2000)
 Griffin EP (2000)
 Smogus EP (2002)
 No Matter What The Outcome (2004)
 Live & Unplugged (2005)

Dutch musical groups